You Are Here is an outdoor 2012 bronze sculpture by American artist Ron Baron, installed at Providence Park in Portland, Oregon, United States. It is part of the City of Portland and Multnomah County Public Art Collection courtesy of the Regional Arts & Culture Council, which administers the work.

Description and history
Ron Baron's You Are Here was completed and installed in the northeast courtyard of Providence Park (then known as Jeld-Wen Field) in downtown Portland in 2012. The bronze sculpture was funded by the City of Portland's Percent for Art program and measures  x  x . Baron recalled about the work's origins:

Furthermore, he said of the sculpture:

The sculpture is part of the City of Portland and Multnomah County Public Art Collection courtesy of the Regional Arts & Culture Council, which administers the work.

See also

 2012 in art
 Facing the Crowd (2001), a sculpture series installed outside Providence Park

References

External links

 Log slab sculpture depicting Goose Hollow history unveiled at Jeld-Wen Field by Molly Hottle (March 9, 2012), The Oregonian
 What's New in Public Art by Peggy Kendellen (May 2012), Art Notes, Regional Arts & Culture Council (PDF)
 You Are Here at ArtsAmerica.org
 You Are Here: New Art at Jeld-Wen Field – Providence Park

2012 establishments in Oregon
2012 sculptures
Bronze sculptures in Oregon
Goose Hollow, Portland, Oregon
Outdoor sculptures in Portland, Oregon
Portland Timbers